Red Trigger -Aka no Yuuhatsu Omoi Douki- (Red Trigger－赤の誘発思動期－), also known as Quantum Mechanics Rainbow VII: Red Trigger, is the twelfth solo album from Japanese musician Daisuke Asakura released on March 3, 2005. The album is the seventh and final in the Quantum Mechanics Rainbow series. The concept of this series is "one album for every rainbow color and a different Quantum Mechanics term".

Track listing

All songs produced, composed and arranged by Daisuke Asakura.

References
 Official Daisuke Asakura Profile
 Daisuke Asakura Discography on Sony Music Japan

2005 albums
Daisuke Asakura albums